The South Burnett Region is a local government area in the South Burnett district of Queensland, Australia.

Origins
This Local Government was created in March 2008 as a result of the report of the Local Government Reform Commission released in July 2007.

Prior to the 2008 amalgamation, the South Burnett Region, located in the southern catchment of the Burnett River, existed as four distinct local government areas:

 the Shire of Kingaroy;
 the Shire of Nanango;
 the Shire of Murgon;
 and the Shire of Wondai.

The report recommended the new local government area should not be divided into wards and should elect six councilors and a mayor however the Interim Steering Committee applied to the State Government for four wards based on the old shire boundaries. As the total population is just a few hundred short of the level set in the report for eight councilors and a mayor, application for this was also made.

Area and size
The South Burnett Region covers an area , containing a population of 32,555 in June 2018 and has an estimated operating budget of A$42 m (as at 2008).

The Aboriginal community of Cherbourg has been excluded from the amalgamated area and continues to have its own local government.

Towns and localities
The South Burnett Region includes the following settlements:

Kingaroy area:
 Coolabunia
 Ellesmere
 Goodger
 Haly Creek
 Inverlaw
 Kingaroy
 Kumbia
 Memerambi
 Taabinga
 Wooroolin

Nanango area:
 Benarkin
 Benarkin North
 Blackbutt
 Brooklands
 Bunya Mountains
 East Nanango
 Glan Devon
 Maidenwell
 Nanango
 South East Nanango
 Taromeo

Murgon area:
 Cloyna
 Moffatdale
 Murgon
 Tablelands
 Windera
 Wooroonden

Wondai area:
 Boondooma
 Cushnie
 Durong
 Ficks Crossing
 Hivesville
 Mondure
 Proston
 Tingoora
 Wheatlands
 Wondai

Others areas:
 Booie
 Byee
 Crawford
 Glenrock
 Gordonbrook
 Ironpot
 Kawl Kawl
 Marshlands
 Runnymede
 Silverleaf
 Tarong
 Wattle Camp

Libraries 
The South Burnett Regional Council operate public libraries at Blackbutt, Kingaroy, Murgon, Nanango, Proston, and Wondai.

Mayor and Councillors

2008 election
On 15 March 2008, the first mayor elected to the South Burnett Region was David Ian Carter.

The first councillors elected to the South Burnett Region were as follows:

 Division 1: Barry Green 
 Division 2: Debra Palmer 
 Division 3: Damien Tessmann 
 Division 4: Keith Campbell (unopposed) 
 Division 5: Kathy Duff 
 Division 6: Cheryl Dalton

2012 election
In the elections held on 28 April 2012, Wayne Kratzmann was elected mayor; he was unopposed.

The councillors elected were:
 Division 1: Barry Green (continuing)
 Division 2: Debra Palmer (continuing, unopposed) 
 Division 3: Damien Tessman (unopposed)
 Division 4: Keith Campbell (continuing) 
 Division 5: Kathy Duff (continuing, unopposed) 
 Division 6: Cheryl Dalton (continuing)

2016 election 
In the elections held on 19 March 2016, Keith Campbell was elected mayor; he was one of five candidates.

The councillors elected were:
 Division 1: Roz Frohloff
 Division 2: Gavin Jones 
 Division 3: Danita Potter
 Division 4: Terry Fleischfresser 
 Division 5: Kathy Duff (continuing, unopposed) 
 Division 6: Ros Heit

2020 election 
In the election held on 28 March 2020, Brett Wayne Otto was elected mayor.

The councillors elected were:

 Division 1: Roslyn Jeanette Frohloff
 Division 2: Gavin Anthony Jones
 Division 3: Danita Alison Potter
 Division 4: Kirstie Michelle Schumacher
 Division 5: Kathryn Anne Duff
 Division 6: Scott William Henschen

References

External links
South Burnett Regional Council
Interactive Map of the South Burnett Region (Electoral Commission Queensland web site) Retrieved 18 April 2008 

 
Local government areas of Queensland
2008 establishments in Australia